Frederick Montague, 1st Baron Amwell, CBE (8 October 1876 – 15 October 1966) was a British Labour Party politician.

Amwell was the son of John Montague and Mary Ann Manderson. His birth was registered in Holborn, Middlesex in the fourth quarter of 1876. He worked as a newsboy and as a shop assistant and later became a copywriter and political agent. He served in the First World War, achieving the rank of Lieutenant in the 1st Battalion of the Northamptonshire Regiment. After the war he was an Alderman of the Islington Council between 1919 and 1925. In 1923 Amwell was elected to the House of Commons as Member of Parliament (MP) for Islington West, a seat he held until 1931 and again from 1935 to 1947, and served under Ramsay MacDonald as Under-Secretary of State for Air from 1927 to 1931. He did not serve in the National Government but held office in Winston Churchill's war coalition as Parliamentary Secretary to the Ministry of Transport from 1940 to 1941 and to the Ministry of Aircraft Production from 1941 to 1942. He was made a CBE in 1946 and in 1947 he was raised to the peerage as Baron Amwell, of Islington in the County of London.

Lord Amwell married Constance Mary, daughter of James Craig, in 1911. They had one son and two daughters. Lady Amwell died in 1964. Amwell survived her by two years and died in October 1966, aged 90. He was succeeded in the barony by his only son Frederick.

Montague was a keen magician and served as a vice-president of London's Magicians' Club. He wrote Westminster Wizardry, a book on magic tricks.

References

Kidd, Charles & Williamson, David (editors). Debrett's Peerage and Baronetage (1990 edition). New York: St Martin's Press, 1990.

Amwell, Frederick Montague, 1st Baron
Amwell, Frederick Montague, 1st Baron
Commanders of the Order of the British Empire
Labour Party (UK) MPs for English constituencies
Labour Party (UK) hereditary peers
Members of Islington Metropolitan Borough Council
Ministers in the Churchill wartime government, 1940–1945
UK MPs 1923–1924
UK MPs 1924–1929
UK MPs 1929–1931
UK MPs 1935–1945
UK MPs 1945–1950
UK MPs who were granted peerages
Barons created by George VI